Ram Singh is an Indian politician belonging to Bharatiya Janata Party. He was elected as a member of Bihar Legislative Assembly from Bagaha in 2020 Bihar Legislative Assembly election replacing Raghaw Sharan Pandey former IAS officer who won the seat in 2015 election.

References

Living people
People from West Champaran district
Bharatiya Janata Party politicians from Bihar
Bihar MLAs 2020–2025
1955 births